The 2018–19 IP Superliga e Basketbollit is the 25th season of the Kosovo Basketball Superleague. It started on 22 September 2018.

Teams

Lipjani promoted as champion of the second league.

Peja was expelled from the league due to not meeting the criteria for being admitted. Ponte Prizreni replaced them.

Regular season

League table

Results

Playoffs
Playoffs will be played in a best-of-five playoff format. The higher seeded teams played game 1, 2 and 5 at home in the semifinals and games 1, 3 and 5 in the finals.

Bracket

Quarter-finals

|}

Semi-finals

|}

Finals

|}

Relegation playoffs

Finals

|}

Kosovan clubs in European competitions

References

External links
Official website of Kosovo Basketball Superleague 

Kosovo Basketball Superleague seasons
Kosovo
Basketball